Parliamentary elections were held in Benin on 26 April 2015.

Electoral system
The 83 members of the National Assembly are elected in 24 multi-member constituencies, based on the country's departments. Seats are allocated using proportional representation based on the simple quotient, with remaining seats assigned using the largest remainder method.

Conduct
Observers from the African Union stated that the elections were generally transparent, despite some organisational challenges.

Results

Aftermath
When the National Assembly began meeting for its new term, Adrien Houngbédji was elected as President of the National Assembly on the night of 19–20 May 2015; as the candidate representing the opposition, he received 42 votes, while the candidate representing President Yayi Boni's supporters, Komi Koutché, received 41. Members of the opposition dominated the Bureau of the National Assembly, obtaining six of its seven posts.

References

Elections in Benin
Benin
Election
Election and referendum articles with incomplete results
National Assembly (Benin)